The Veracruz montane forests is a tropical moist broadleaf forest ecoregion in eastern Mexico. It includes a belt of montane tropical forest on the eastern slope of the southern Sierra Madre Oriental and eastern Trans-Mexican Volcanic Belt ranges. These forests lie between the lowland Veracruz moist forests and the pine-oak forests of the higher mountains.

The Veracruz montane forests are the northernmost tropical montane moist forests in North America.

Flora
The forests are composed of evergreen broadleaf trees, which form a closed canopy. Epiphytes, including orchids, bromeliads, mosses, and lichens, are abundant.

The upper and lower montane forests vary somewhat in species composition. Lower montane forests predominate between 1,250 and 1,630 meters elevation. Characteristic trees are Clethra macrophylla, Liquidambar styraciflua, and Turpinia insignis, with Quercus sartorii, Quercus xalapensis, Carpinus tropicalis, and others.

In the upper montane forests Prunus rhamnoides and Quercus corrugata are the predominant species from 1800 to 2250 meters elevation, together with Cleyera theaeoides, Ternstroemia sylvatica, Weinmannia intermedia, Clethra schlechtendalii, and others. Forests dominated by Fagus grandifolia also grow in the upper montane zone, mostly between 1800 and 1900 meters elevation, with Ternstroemia sylvatica, Vaccinium leucanthum, Persea americana, and Oreopanax xalapensis.

Fauna
Mammals native to the ecoregion include the six species of large cats – jaguar (Panthera onca), ocelot (Leopardus pardalus), margay (Leopardus weidii), puma (Puma concolor), jaguarundi (Herpailurus yagouaroundi), and bobcat (Lynx rufus). Hoofed mammals include the white-tailed deer (Odocoileus virginianus), red brocket (Mazama americana), and collared peccary (Tayassu tajacu). other mammals include the ringtail (Bassariscus astutus), long-tailed weasel (Neogale frenata), kinkajou (Potos flavus), tayra (Eira barbara), Mexican tree porcupine (Coendou mexicanus), nine-banded armadillo (Dasypus novemcinctus), and northern tamandua (Tamandua mexicana).

Native birds include the military macaw (Ara militaris), great curassow (Crax rubra), crested guan (Penelope purpurascens), white-crowned parrot (Pionus senilis), red-tailed hawk (Buteo jamaicensis), and many neotropical migratory birds.

Protected areas
A 2017 assessment found that about 40% of the ecoregion is still forested. 303 km², or 6%, of the ecoregion is in protected areas. Protected areas include the Sierra Gorda Biosphere Reserve, Zacatepec Ecological Conservation Area, Chicamole Ecological Conservation Area, Finca Tegolome Ecological Reserve, Zona Protectora Forestal Vedada Cuenca Hidrográfica del Río Necaxa Natural Resources Protection Area	(which is also a Ramsar Site), and the Cacalotepec fracción primera y fracción segunda and Área de Preservación de la Naturaleza y Zona de Usos Múltiples para el Ecoturismo Kolijke voluntary conservation areas.

See also
 List of ecoregions in Mexico

External links

References

Ecoregions of Mexico
Montane forests
Natural history of Hidalgo (state)
Natural history of Puebla
Natural history of Veracruz
Neotropical tropical and subtropical moist broadleaf forests
Cloud forests of Mexico